Robert A. Higgins (November 24, 1893 – June 6, 1969) was an American football player and coach. He played college football at Pennsylvania State University, where he was a three-time All-America, and then with professionally with the Canton Bulldogs in 1920 and 1921. Higgins served as the head football coach at West Virginia Wesleyan College (1920, 1922–1924), Washington University in St. Louis (1925–1927), and Pennsylvania State University, compiling a career college football record of 123–83–16. He was inducted into the College Football Hall of Fame as a coach in 1954.

Playing career

Collegiate
Higgins played at Penn State from 1914 to 1917, and was named an All-American in 1915. After spending World War I in the service, he returned to captain Penn State, earning All-America honors again in 1919. In a 20–0 victory over Pittsburgh that season, Higgins caught a pass from Walter Hess and turned it into a thrilling 92-yard touchdown and was immortalized in Knute Rockne's "Great Football Plays."

Professional
In 1920 and 1921, Higgins played end for the Canton Bulldogs of the National Football League.

Coaching career
Higgins coached four seasons at West Virginia Wesleyan (1920, 1922–1924), and three seasons at Washington University in St. Louis. He returned to Penn State in 1928, first as an assistant coach, before becoming head coach in 1930. He served as head coach there for the next 19 seasons. He led the Nittany Lions to only the second unbeaten season in the school's history, culminating in a tie versus Southern Methodist University in the 1948 Cotton Bowl Classic. It marked only the second time that Penn State had played in a bowl game.

Ill health forced Higgins' retirement after the 1948 season, but he remained at Penn State as a special assistant in the Physical Education Department until his retirement in November 1951. His overall coaching record was 123–83–16. He was inducted into the College Football Hall of Fame in 1954.

Family
Higgins was a brother of Margaret Sanger, famed campaigner for birth control, family planning and social reform. His youngest daughter, Nancy married, James J. Dooley Jr., who was a second-team All-American center in 1952 at Penn State. Their son, James J. Dooley III, played football at Penn State from 1979 to 1981. Their other son, Peter Dooley, was on the cross country and track and field teams at Penn State from 1982 to 84. Higgin's eldest grandson, Robert Lyford, son of Higgins eldest daughter Mary Ann, played basketball at Penn State during the late 1960s.

Higgins' daughter Virginia ("Ginger") married All-American guard and fellow College Football Hall of Fame inductee Steve Suhey. He is the maternal grandfather of Penn State standouts Paul Suhey and Larry Suhey and former Chicago Bears fullback, Matt Suhey. More recently, Paul's son, Kevin, and Matt's son, Joe, have played for the Nittany Lions. The Higgins-Suhey family has been called the "first family of Penn State football", with 90 years of involvement with the program.

Head coaching record

See also
 List of College Football Hall of Fame inductees (coaches)

References

External links
 
 

1893 births
1969 deaths
American football ends
Canton Bulldogs players
Penn State Nittany Lions football coaches
Penn State Nittany Lions football players
Washington University Bears football coaches
West Virginia Wesleyan Bobcats football coaches
Pennsylvania State University faculty
All-American college football players
College Football Hall of Fame inductees
American military personnel of World War I
People from Corning, New York